The SM-liiga (marketed as just Liiga from 2013 on), (Finnish for League) colloquially called the Finnish Elite League in English or FM-ligan in Swedish, is the top professional ice hockey league in Finland. It was created in 1975 to replace the SM-sarja, which was fundamentally an amateur league. The SM-liiga is not directly overseen by the Finnish Ice Hockey Association, but the league and association have an agreement of cooperation. SM is a common abbreviation for Suomen mestaruus, "Finnish championship".

The SM-liiga formerly had a system of automatic promotion and relegation in place between itself and the Mestis, the second highest level of competition in Finland, but the automatic system was ended in 2000. The league was opened in 2005 and allowed KalPa to get a promotion. In 2009, a new system was introduced and it includes the last placed SM-liiga team facing the Mestis champion in a best of seven playout series. In 2013, the relegation system was abandoned again and replaced by a procedure in which successful clubs of Mestis may apply for a promotion if they fulfill definite financial criteria. Since 2013, Jokerit joined the KHL and Espoo Blues went bankrupt, but Sport, KooKoo and Jukurit were promoted. Therefore Liiga is a competition of 15 teams since the 2016–17 season.

Teams from the Liga participate in the IIHF's annual Champions Hockey League (CHL), competing for the European Trophy. Participation is based on the strength of the various leagues in Europe (excluding the European/Asian Kontinental Hockey League). Going into the 2022–23 CHL season, the Liga was ranked the No. 4 league in Europe, allowing them to send their top four teams to compete in the CHL.

History

The SM-liiga was constituted in 1975 to concentrate the development of top-level Finnish ice hockey, and pave the way towards professionalism. Its predecessor, the SM-sarja, being an amateur competition, had its disadvantages, which were perceived as impeding Finland's rise to the highest ranks of ice hockey. SM-liiga hired Kalervo Kummola as its first chief executive officer, who served until 1987.

One of the main problems was that the governing of the SM-sarja was based on the annual meeting of the Finnish Ice Hockey Association, where all important issues were decided by vote. Since all clubs registered under the Finnish Ice Hockey Association had the right to vote, the many amateur clubs prevailed over the few business-like clubs. Therefore, the concentrated development of top-level Finnish ice hockey by the motivated and financially capable clubs proved arduous. The new SM-liiga was to be run by a board consisting of its participating clubs only and to have an agreement of cooperation with the Finnish Ice Hockey Association.

The SM-sarja was also outdated on its own, as it was run according to amateur principles. Clubs were not supposed to pay their players beyond compensation for lost wages. However, by the 1970s many clubs were already run like businesses and recruited players through a contract of employment, paying their wages secretly and often evading taxes. However, in 1974, accounting reform in Finland extended book-keeping standards to cover sports clubs, and shortfalls were exposed in audit raids. The SM-liiga was to allow wages for players, and clubs were also put under a tighter supervision. They were to establish their own association for SM-liiga ice hockey only, separating their commitments from junior activities and other sports. Copies of all player contracts were to be sent to the SM-liiga to provide players with adequate security, such as insurance and pensions.

The SM-sarja had other limits for players. According to amateur ideals, no player could represent more than one club within one season. Personal sponsorship was also forbidden. To discourage trading, a system of quarantine was in force. The SM-liiga stripped the limitations for players, replaced quarantine with a then-modest transfer payment, and introduced the transfer list. Players wanting a transfer were to sign up, and the SM-liiga would distribute the right of negotiations to clubs. In practice, the list was not successful, as both parties often worked their way around the formalities.

These changes led to a transition towards professional ice hockey as the league became semi-professional. Only a few players would make a livelihood out of ice hockey in Finland in the 1970s, and many players, especially the young, would settle for a contract in the SM-liiga without a wage.

A major financial development for professional ice hockey in Finland was the introduction of playoffs. Gate receipts and other income from playoffs were pooled and distributed as a placement bonus. Although playoffs were the standard way of determining the champions in North American professional sports, at the time they were not common in Europe.

The SM-liiga was established rather hastily. The required changes were initiated at the 1974 annual meeting, and the SM-liiga was launched for the 1975–76 season. It was the first Finnish professional sports league, and its solutions were untried. However, there had been a mounting demand for these changes, as the popularity of ice hockey had been rising in the previous decade.

The SM-liiga picked up where the SM-sarja left off with its 10 clubs. The four best of the regular season were to proceed to the playoffs. The system of promotion and relegation from the SM-sarja remained in force: last-placed teams of the regular season had to qualify for their position in the SM-liiga against the best teams of the second-highest series.

The combined attendance for the first eleven regular seasons hovered around 900,000. In 1986–87, the number of games for each team was increased from 36 to 44, reaching its current level of 56 games in 2000–01, and the SM-liiga was expanded to 12 clubs for the 1988–89 season. The general popularity of ice hockey strengthened through international success of the Finland men's national ice hockey team, and the combined attendance climbed through the 1990s to about 1.8 million. This prompted an increase in the profitability of the ice hockey business and the completion of the transition to full professionalism. By the mid-1990s, all players were full-time, and by 2000, most clubs had reformed into limited companies. In late 1990s and early 2000s the SM-liiga was the strongest hockey league in Europe and the second strongest in the world. At that time many Finnish, Czech and North American players made their professional breakthroughs in Finland. Particularly HIFK, Jokerit and TPS had many former and future NHL players in their rosters during the 1990s and early 2000s.

Since the 2000–01 season, the SM-liiga has been closed, meaning that relegations and promotions take place only by the judgment of the board of the SM-liiga. The only such promotion took place instantly in 2000. Without the threat of relegation, the weaker clubs were supposed to be able to recuperate and improve. This had, however, a side effect: clubs with a losing record that had lost their hopes of reaching the playoffs often disposed of high-salary star players, letting down their supporters. To counteract this, the playoffs were expanded to the best 10 clubs each season from among the 13 total in the league.

The league changed its name to just Liiga for the 2013–14 season, and introduced a new logo to match.

Today, there are 15 teams in the league. Nowadays the SM-liiga is considered one of the strongest leagues in Europe along with the SHL and behind the KHL.

Clubs
The team names are usually the traditional name of the club. All clubs are commonly known by the name of their team. Oy and Ab are the abbreviations for limited company in Finnish and Swedish respectively.

Past participants

Renamed, still in Liiga
 JyP HT and Jyp (now JYP)
 Kiekkoreipas, Hockey-Reipas, and Reipas Lahti (now Pelicans)

Relegated prior to 2000
Teams relegated were relegated to second-tier Mestis in the year shown, and are there today unless noted otherwise.
 FoPS (relegated 1977, now FPS in second-tier Mestis)
 KOO-VEE (relegated 1980)
 JoKP (relegated 1992, now Kiekko-pojat)
 TuTo (relegated 1996, now TUTO Hockey)

Withdrew from league
 Jokerit (left after the 2013–14 season to join the KHL; looking to return in 2023–24)
 Blues (originally Kiekko-Espoo (or K-Espoo); went bankrupt at the end of the 2015–16 Liiga season. Modern Kiekko-Espoo now in Mestis)

SM-liiga/Liiga timeline

Format

Regular season: All teams play 60 matches, a quadruple round robin with extra local double rounds (i.e., every team plays four matches against every other team, plus two extra matches against two defined local opponents). Each match consists of 60 minutes regulation time, and in the event of a tie, the winner is decided by a three-on-three sudden death, 5-minute overtime. Ties after overtime are decided by a shootout, where each team has three shooters in the beginning. If the game is tied after three shooters, the shootout will be decided by individual shooters against one another until one scores and the other does not.

The 2010–11 season also saw the inaugural Talviklassikko outdoor game at Helsinki's Olympic Stadium. In the Helsinki derby, HIFK defeated Jokerit 4–3. Since then, seven other outdoor matches have been played.

Scoring: A win in regulation time is worth three points, a win by sudden death overtime two points, a loss by sudden death overtime one point and a loss in regulation time zero points. Teams will be ranked by points, and teams tied by points are ranked by the greater number of wins in regulation.

Playoffs: The six best teams at the conclusion of regular season proceed directly to quarter-finals. Teams placing between seventh and tenth (inclusive) will play preliminary play-offs best-out-of-three – the two winners take the last two slots to quarter-finals. Starting from the season 2007–2008 all series since then are best-of-seven. Losers of the semi-finals play a bronze medal match. Teams are paired up for each round according to regular season results so that the highest-ranking team will play against the lowest-ranking, second highest against the second lowest, and so on. Higher-ranking teams play the first match at home, then by turns away, home, away, etc. Each playoff match consists of a 60-minute regulation time which in the event of a tie is followed by extra 20-minute periods of 5-on-5 sudden death overtime, in which the first team to score wins.

Scheduling: The regular season begins around mid-September. It takes a one-and-half-week break around the end of October to the beginning of November, when Team Finland competes in Karjala Tournament. There is a one-week Christmas break. During Winter Olympic years, a break is reserved for the Winter Olympic Games. The regular season is completed around mid-March and preliminary playoffs ensue almost immediately. The playoffs are completed by mid-April, so that all players are available for the World Championships.

Winner

 
The winners of the playoffs receive gold medals and the Kanada-malja, the championship trophy of the Liiga. The winners of the regular season receive a trophy (Harry Lindbladin muistopalkinto) as well, though it is considered less prestigious than the bronze medals of the playoffs, similar to the difference in the National Hockey League between the status of the Stanley Cup and the Presidents' Trophy.

Previous winners

Previous SM-liiga winners

1976 – TPS
1977 – Tappara
1978 – Ässät
1979 – Tappara
1980 – HIFK
1981 – Kärpät
1982 – Tappara
1983 – HIFK
1984 – Tappara 
1985 – Ilves
1986 – Tappara 
1987 – Tappara
1988 – Tappara
1989 – TPS 
1990 – TPS 
1991 – TPS
1992 – Jokerit
1993 – TPS
1994 – Jokerit
1995 – TPS
1996 – Jokerit
1997 – Jokerit
1998 – HIFK
1999 – TPS
2000 – TPS
2001 – TPS
2002 – Jokerit
2003 – Tappara
2004 – Kärpät
2005 – Kärpät
2006 – HPK
2007 – Kärpät
2008 – Kärpät
2009 – JYP
2010 – TPS
2011 – HIFK
2012 – JYP
2013 – Ässät
2014 – Kärpät
2015 – Kärpät
2016 – Tappara
2017 – Tappara
2018 – Kärpät
2019 – HPK
2020 – 
2021 – Lukko
2022 - Tappara

Previous SM-liiga/Liiga playoff winners (Finnish Champions)

1976 – TPS
1977 – Tappara
1978 – Ässät
1979 – Tappara
1980 – HIFK
1981 – Kärpät
1982 – Tappara
1983 – HIFK
1984 – Tappara
1985 – Ilves
1986 – Tappara
1987 – Tappara
1988 – Tappara
1989 – TPS
1990 – TPS
1991 – TPS
1992 – Jokerit
1993 – TPS
1994 – Jokerit
1995 – TPS
1996 – Jokerit
1997 – Jokerit
1998 – HIFK
1999 – TPS
2000 – TPS
2001 – TPS
2002 – Jokerit
2003 – Tappara
2004 – Kärpät
2005 – Kärpät
2006 – HPK
2007 – Kärpät
2008 – Kärpät
2009 – JYP
2010 – TPS
2011 – HIFK
2012 – JYP
2013 – Ässät
2014 – Kärpät
2015 – Kärpät
2016 – Tappara
2017 – Tappara
2018 – Kärpät
2019 – HPK
2020 – (cancelled)
2021 - Lukko 
2022 – Tappara

All time statistical leaders

Top 10 regular-season scoring leaders
These are the top-ten regular season point-scorers in Liiga history. Figures are updated after each completed Liiga regular season.
  – current player
Note: Pos = Position; GP = Games Played; G = Goals; A = Assists; Pts = Points

Top 10 regular-season scoring leaders (imports)
These are the top-ten regular season point-scorers for import players in Liiga history. Figures are updated after each completed Liiga regular season.
  – current player
Note: Pos = Position; GP = Games Played; G = Goals; A = Assists; Pts = Points

Top 10 regular-season games played (goaltender)
These are the top-ten most regular season games played by a goaltender in Liiga history. Figures are updated after each completed Liiga regular season.
  – current player

Trophies
The following trophies are awarded by the Liiga:

 Harry Lindblad memorial trophy – Liiga Regular season winner
 Kultainen kypärä – best player as voted by Liiga players
 Kalevi Numminen trophy – best coach
 Jarmo Wasama memorial trophy – rookie of the year
 Matti Keinonen trophy – most effective player
 Raimo Kilpiö trophy – most gentlemanly player
 Urpo Ylönen trophy – best goaltender
 Pekka Rautakallio trophy – best defenseman
 Aarne Honkavaara trophy – most goals scored in the regular season ("best goal scorer")
 Veli-Pekka Ketola trophy – most points scored during the regular season
 Lasse Oksanen trophy – best player during the regular season
 Jari Kurri trophy – best player during the playoffs
 Unto Wiitala trophy – Best referee during the regular season
 Pentti Isotalo trophy – Best linesman during the regular season
 Golden whistle trophy – Best referee of the year, voted by players

In 1995, the trophies were named after Finnish hockey legends. Before that, trophies were named after sponsors.

See also
 List of Liiga seasons
 List of Finnish ice hockey champions
 Mestis
 Naisten Liiga
 SM-sarja
 Ice hockey in Finland
 Leijonat

References

External links

 
 

 
Sports leagues established in 1975
1975 establishments in Finland
Professional ice hockey leagues in Finland
Top tier ice hockey leagues in Europe